Escàs is a village in Andorra, located in the parish of La Massana.

Sport
The construction company, Construccions Buiques, has its head office in Escàs, and sponsors a football team Construccions Buiques Rànger's, also known informally as FC Rànger's, that plays in Andorra's national First Division football league.

References

Populated places in Andorra
La Massana